Pulchroboletus is a fungal genus in the family Boletaceae. It was circumscribed in 2014 to contain the species formerly known as Xerocomus roseoalbidus, a rare bolete fungus originally described from Sardinia, Italy. Pulchroboletus roseoalbidus is found in Mediterranean Europe, where it grows in association with oak species and less often Cistus species. In 2017, the species Boletus rubricitrinus was moved to Pulchroboletus. Pulchroboletus rubricitrinus can be found under Quercus in lawns in Florida and Texas.

Species 
Pulchroboletus roseoalbidus

Pulchroboletus rubricitrinus

References

External links
 

Boletaceae
Fungi of Europe
Monotypic Boletales genera